Woolworths was a New Zealand supermarket and general merchandise retail chain between 1929 and 2018.

The brand was phased-out in the late 2000s. All but one store were rebranded as Countdown by 2011, with the exception in a location that already had a Countdown supermarket.

In addition to groceries, some stores had a license to sell beer and wine.

History

Woolworths (1929–1979)

Piercy Christmas opened the first Woolworths store on Cuba Street, Wellington in 1929. It expanded into a chain of stores, initially selling general merchandise.

In 1963, Milne & Choyce, Farmers Trading Company and Woolworths formed a joint venture to establish New Zealand's first shopping mall in New Lynn, Auckland. All three companies established anchor stores in the new mall.

Woolworths opened the first supermarket in Hastings in 1965.

Woolworths acquired the Self Help grocery chain in the early 1970s and began to rebrand these as Woolworths in 1973.

L.D. Nathan (1979–1990)

L.D. Nathan, the owner of the Super Value supermarket chain, purchased Woolworths for $12 million in 1979.

L.D. Nathan acquired 70 McKenzies general merchandise stores in 1980, rebranding the stores as Woolworths.

The general merchandise stores were rebranded as DEKA in 1988.

L. D. Nathan established the discount supermarket chain Price Chopper in 1987, and the Big Fresh supermarket chain in 1988.

Dairy Farm International (1990–2002)

In 1990, Hong Kong's Dairy Farm International acquired the Woolworths New Zealand business, consisting of Woolworths, Price Chopper and Big Fresh chains.

Woolworths launched New Zealand's first online supermarket in 1996.

Between 1990 and 2000, Woolworths trialled a network of min-supermarkets in BP petrol stations.

In 2001, Woolworths began operating mini-supermarkets at 17 Gull New Zealand stores.

By 2002, Woolworths New Zealand consisted of 83 supermarkets branded as Woolworths, Big Fresh and Price Chopper. It was the country's third-largest supermarket group, with a market share of about 20%.

Progressive Enterprises (2002–2005)

Progressive Enterprises, the owner of Foodtown, Countdown, SuperValue and FreshChoice, made a bid to purchase Woolworths New Zealand in May 2001. The merger application was cleared by the Commerce Commission but then withdrawn following court action by rival Foodstuffs.

Progressive made another application for the merger in October 2001. The Commerce Commission declined the application in December 2001. Australia's Woolworths Group also expressed interest in acquiring the company.

In April 2002, Progressive convinced the Judicial Committee of the Privy Council to uphold the Commerce Commission's clearance of the original merger application. Dairy Farm International agreed to the sale, and the merger proceeded later in 2002.

In 2003, there were 59 full-format Woolworths stores, including 17 in Auckland. There were also 26 Woolworths mini-supermarkets, including 14 in Auckland.

Progressive Enterprises launched its onecard loyalty card in 2003, based on the Foodtown loyalty card launched in 1994.

Woolworths Group (2005–2009)

Australia's Woolworths Group acquired Progressive Enterprises in 2005, including the Woolworths chain.

In October 2006, Woolworths began operating fuel discount vouches for Shell New Zealand and Gull New Zealand.

In 2008, Woolworths had 61 full-format stores, including 10 in Auckland. It also had 18 mini-supermarkets at Gull New Zealand petrol stations, including 11 in Auckland. 

In 2008 Progressive Enterprises approached its 943 New Zealand suppliers (which Woolworths calls "Trade Partners") to use electronic commerce or EDI to integrate supply chain orders (such as Purchase Orders and Invoices) in the same way that Woolworths does in Australia.

Rebranding (2009–2018)

In September 2009, it was announced that the Woolworths brand would almost cease to exist as most of the stores would be rebranded as Countdown over a five-year period.

By August 2010, the Woolworths brand had ceased to exist in the South Island. On 14 November 2011, the Meadowlands store in Howick, Auckland was rebranded as Countdown, marking the official end of the Woolworths brand.

The 21 Woolworths mini-supermarkets at Gull petrol stations were taken over by Night 'n Day from June 2011.

Woolworths Bayfair in Mount Maunganui continued to operate under the Woolworths brand. A new Countdown supermarket opened in Bayfair in December 2018.

Private label brands

2002–2011
 Woolworths Select
 Woolworths Home Brand / Basics
 Woolworths Naytura
 Woolworths Freefrom
 Woolworths Essentials
 Signature Range

1990–2002

 No Frills
 First Choice

References

External links
 Woolworths Supermarkets (New Zealand)
 Progressive Enterprises Ltd

Supermarkets of New Zealand
New Zealand companies established in 1929
Retail companies established in 1929
Retail companies disestablished in 2011
Woolworths Group (Australia)
Defunct retail companies of New Zealand